The Pickup Artist is an American reality television dating themed game show that aired on VH1. The show was hosted by pickup artist Mystery (Erik von Markovik) and his wings J-Dog (Justin Marks) and James Matador, with Tara Ferguson replacing J-Dog in season 2. The first season featured eight male contestants that had previously been unsuccessful in love and relationships. Throughout the show the contestants are tutored in the art of the "pickup" as taught by Mystery and his wings. In each episode the men were given challenges that involved picking women up in different situations, such as on a bridge during the day or in a nightclub. As the show progressed the men were instructed to pick up women of varying levels of difficulty, such as in the second to last challenge of the first season where the men had to pick up a stripper, described by Mystery as "the ultimate challenge." The winner of the first season was Alvaro "Kosmo" Orlando.

The second season featured nine contestants and aired in October 2008, with the second season's winner being 27-year-old Simeon Moses.

Seasons

Season One

Contestants

Episode Progress

 The contestant won immunity.
 The contestant was chosen as a wingman and had immunity.
 The contestant was eliminated.
 The contestant quit the competition.
 The contestant won the title of the Pickup Artist.
Note 1: Episode 1 had no elimination.
Note 2: Alvaro changed his name to Kosmo in Episode 2.
Note 3: Contrary to statements made earlier in the episode, no wing men were allowed to be selected in Episode 5.
Note 4: Episode 8 was a recap episode.

Season Two

Contestants

Episode Progress

 The contestant won immunity.
 The contestant was chosen as a wingman and had immunity.
 The contestant was eliminated.
 The contestant won the title of the Pickup Artist.

Reception
The initial viewer ratings were disappointing, debuting with only 673,000 viewers. Viewer ratings picked up by the season's end, resulting in the series being picked up for a second season.

Critical reception for the series was mixed, with The A.V. Club panning the second season's opening episode.

Controversy
Controversy began to cloud The Pickup Artist after revelations that some of the contestants' livelihoods were not as they were listed on the VH1 show profiles. Alvaro "Kosmo" Orlando had been referred to as a game programmer, but he actually had been an aspiring actor for the previous four years - working out of Miami, New York, and Los Angeles. Runner-up contestant Brady Sprunger was characterized as a shy photographer, but he had been working for a modeling agency, the Los Angeles-based Action Agency, for five full years prior to the show's taping.

According to Psychology Today, the empirical feeling "that some teachings of pick-up artists are grounded in theory does not negate the callous and objectionable nature of the field.", so that it belongs to pseudoscience without empirical evidence of truth.

See also
 Keys to the VIP

References
Notes

Sources

External links
 VH1.com: The Pick Up Artist – Official Site 
 VH1.com: The Pick Up Artist 2 – Official Site 
 The Pick-up Artist (V-spot).
 

2000s American reality television series
VH1 original programming
Seduction community
2007 American television series debuts
2008 American television series endings
American dating and relationship reality television series
English-language television shows
Television shows set in Austin, Texas